Andries Stefanus Schutte (born 18 January 1994) is a South African professional rugby union player who last played for the  in the Currie Cup and the Rugby Challenge. He can play as a loosehead or tighthead prop.

Rugby career

2007–2012 : Schoolboy rugby

However, he did not play in any national tournaments at high school level.

2013–2019 : Falcons

Schutte scored his third try of the competition in the final, but it was to no avail as the team from Port Elizabeth won 56–40 to be crowned champions.

He played in two more matches in the competition as the Falcons finished in sixth place, failing to advance to the First Division. Schutte didn't feature for them in that competition, however, instead moving to the Under-21 squad that competed in the 2014 Under-21 Provincial Championship. The team finished in sixth place, failing to secure a semi-final spot.

From the 2015 season, he firmly established himself in the first team. He started all seven of their matches in the 2015 Vodacom Cup, with his side again missing out on the play-offs by finishing in fifth spot on the Southern Section log. He also appeared in all six of his team's matches in the 2015 Currie Cup qualification series, where the team again qualified for the First Division by finishing third, before also starting all five their matches in the round-robin stage of the First Division. He also started the semi-final, where a 29–17 victory by eventual champions the  ended the Falcons' involvement in the competition.

References

South African rugby union players
Living people
1994 births
People from Govan Mbeki Local Municipality
Rugby union props
Falcons (rugby union) players
Griquas (rugby union) players
Rugby union players from Mpumalanga